Cyclostremella is a minor genus of sea snails, marine gastropod mollusks in the family Pyramidellidae, the pyrams and their allies.

Species
There are three known species within the genus Cyclostremella, with the exception of one being a synonym, these include the following as listed below:
 Cyclostremella concordia Bartsch, 1920
 Cyclostremella humilis Bush, 1897
 Cyclostremella orbis (Carpenter, 1857)

The following species were brought into synonymy:
 Cyclostremella africana Bartsch, 1915 accepted as Solariella fuscomaculata G.B. Sowerby, 1892

References

External links
 To ITIS
 To World Register of Marine Species

Pyramidellidae